Muisi Ajao  (born 2 December 1978) is a Nigerian retired footballer.

He has played a few matches for Nigerian national team and played in the Belgian league and South African Premier League. He played for clubs in Singapore, Qatar and China.

International career
On 16 September 2001, Ajao debuted for Nigeria national football team against South Korea in 1-2 loss match.

References

External links
 
soccernetindia.com
Ajao declares his availability

1978 births
Living people
Sportspeople from Abeokuta
Yoruba sportspeople
Association football defenders
Nigerian footballers
Nigeria international footballers
Bendel United F.C. players
Shooting Stars S.C. players
Bridge F.C. players
Cercle Brugge K.S.V. players
Kaizer Chiefs F.C. players
Mamelodi Sundowns F.C. players
SHB Da Nang FC players
East Bengal Club players
Manning Rangers F.C. players
Belgian Pro League players
Nigerian expatriate footballers
Expatriate footballers in Belgium
Nigerian expatriates in Belgium
Expatriate soccer players in South Africa
Nigerian expatriates in South Africa
Expatriate footballers in Vietnam
Nigerian expatriate sportspeople in Vietnam
Expatriate footballers in India